Vivaramana Aalu is a 2002 Indian Tamil language comedy drama film directed by K. Selva Bharathy. The film stars Sathyaraj, Vivek, Devayani and Mumtaj, with Ponnambalam, Prathap K. Pothan, Kanal Kannan and Manochithra playing supporting roles. The film, produced by V. A. Durai, had musical score by Deva and was released on 14 January 2002.

Plot
In Coimbatore, Mayilsamy is a pickpocket who is determined to make it big in life, by hook or crook. After being released from jail, his friend "Palladam" Bhaskar advises him to go to Chennai and to join the gang of Kota Subramaniam. In the meantime, Kota Subramaniam who is in Coimbatore pressures the innocent village belle Pappu to marry him. Mayilsamy then comes across Kota Subramaniam, he beats him up and steals his money. A politician, who witnessed the scene, asks Mayilsamy to marry Pappu in exchange for money promised by the government for those who marry girls from financially weak families. Mayilsamy marries her and deserts her soon after.

In Chennai, Mayilsamy tries to find Kota Subramaniam. The petty thief "Suitcase" Subbu who used to steal suitcases for a living is now cheating under the name of Dr John Britto, a psychiatrist doctor. When Mayilsamy tries to escape from the police, he ends in the asylum of Dr John Britto. Mayilsamy who knows about "Suitcase" Subbu's secret lies him that he is the real Dr John Britto and he decides to keep "Suitcase" Subbu as his assistant.

Puppy is a wealthy heiress and a mentally ill woman. Her parents, who are hell-bent on saving their family's prestige at any cost, do not want people to know about their daughter's mental illness and they hate each other. Mayilsamy who comes across Puppy decides to become her personal doctor and plans to marry her. Puppy is in fact faking as a mental patient to bring her parents together. Thanks to Mayilsamy, Puppy's parents reconcile and now want Mayilsamy to marry their daughter Pappu. Pappu falls in love with Mayilsamy. In the meantime, Pappu comes to Chennai looking for her husband Mayilsamy and "Suitcase" Subbu decides to help her.

Mayilsamy eventually realises his folly. He decides to live with his wife Pappu and to make an honest living. He also apologizes to Puppy for playing with her feelings.

Cast

Sathyaraj as Mayilsamy
Vivek as "Suitcase" Subbu
Devayani as Pappu
Mumtaj as Puppy
Ponnambalam as Kota Subramaniam
Prathap K. Pothan as Mr O, Puppy's father
Kanal Kannan as Inspector Karuppu
Manochithra as Puppy's mother
Periya Karuppu Thevar as Politician
Tiruppur Ramasamy
Dhadha Muthukumar as "Palladam" Bhaskar
Chelladurai as Kandhasamy
Mayilsamy as Funeral dancer
Scissor Manohar as Anbu
Muthukaalai as Seenu
Bonda Mani as Mentally ill man
Jayamani as Police constable
Kottai Perumal as Police constable
Lekhasri as Rukku
Kottachi as "Suitcase" Subbu's assistant
Soundar as Kota Subramaniam's henchman
Lollu Sabha Soundarya as Young lover
Citizen Mani as Newlywed man
Senthil as Politician (guest appearance)
Vinu Chakravarthy as Inspector Mariappan (guest appearance)
Monal in a special appearance

Soundtrack

The film score and the soundtrack were composed by Deva. The soundtrack, released in 2002, features 5 tracks with lyrics written by Pa. Vijay, Na. Muthukumar and Kabilan.

Reception
Sify wrote, "Director Selvabharathy's idea is to please the frontbenchers as the story moves ahead. There is a comedy, sex, smutty dialogues and jokes galore at politicians especially targeting Tamilnadu chief Minister O. Panneerselvam". Mallini Mannath said, "Verbal and situational comedy, some of them enjoyable, is packed in. The director makes no bones about catering to the masses. Giving Sathyaraj company is Vivek, straining his voice to a crescendo, fitting in well with the director's requirements. Mumtaz, for a change, has a meaty role, and uses well the opportunity given to her".

References

2002 films
Indian comedy-drama films
2000s Tamil-language films
Films scored by Deva (composer)
Films directed by K. Selva Bharathy